The 1985 World Table Tennis Championships – Swaythling Cup (men's team) was the 38th edition of the men's team championship.

China won the gold medal defeating Sweden 5–0 in the final. Poland won the bronze medal.

Medalists

Swaythling Cup tables

Group A

Group B

Semifinals

Third-place playoff

Final

See also
 List of World Table Tennis Championships medalists

References

-